Lineostriastiria sexseriata is a species of moth in the family Noctuidae (the owlet moths). The MONA or Hodges number for Lineostriastiria sexseriata is 9759.

References

Further reading

 
 
 

Amphipyrinae
Articles created by Qbugbot
Moths described in 1881